The School District of the City of Saginaw, known also as the Saginaw Public School District (SPSD) or Saginaw Public Schools, is a school district in Saginaw, Michigan. The district is a part of the Saginaw Intermediate School District, and serves the cities of Saginaw, Buena Vista, and Zilwaukee, the eastern part of Kochville Township, and portions of Buena Vista Township north of Hess Avenue.

History

The Buena Vista School District closed in 2013. The Saginaw School District acquired the Buena Vista headquarters building, all five school buildings and the majority of the school district territory. This territory included areas north of Hess Avenue except for the parcels located between Airport Road and Townline Road that are south of Holland. 261 new students from Buena Vista were expected to attend Saginaw schools. Ultimately 109 former Buena Vista students began attending Saginaw schools.

As part of a budget restructuring process, the Saginaw Public Schools board of education voted to close either Arthur Hill High School or Saginaw High School before the start of the 2015–16 school year. Ultimately, a recommendation to close Saginaw High School was made. However, there was not enough support on the board of education to approval the closure.

Schools
The Saginaw Public School District includes nine elementary schools, one PK-8 schools, one middle school, three high schools.

 *Note: Based on 2003-2004 student count data
 **Note: Based on 2013-2014 student count data
 ***Note: Based on 2012-2013 school year data
 Key: K=Kindergarten; PK=Pre-kindergarten; UG=No grade levels ("ungraded"); n/a=Not applicable (typically an independent charter school); {blank}=Data not available

Former schools
The district has closed, consolidated, or replaced several schools, including:

 *Note: Based student count data
 Key: K=Kindergarten; PK=Pre-kindergarten; UG=No grade levels ("ungraded"); n/a=Not applicable (typically an independent charter school); {blank}=Data not available

References

External links

 Official website

School districts in Michigan
Saginaw, Michigan
Saginaw Intermediate School District